DIPROMISTO (Ukrainian: ДІПРОМІСТО) is a research and planning institute in the field of spatial and urban planning in Ukraine. It is a state enterprise within the field of governance of the Ministry of Regional Development, Construction and Housing of Ukraine. It was established on September 12, 1930. Its full name is State Enterprise Y. Bilokon Ukrainian State Scientific-Research Institute of Urban Design "DIPROMISTO".

In Russian language sources it is also known as Giprograd (Russian: Гипроград). During Soviet times it was a system of planning institutes consisting of the central institute in Kyiv and a range of affiliates in oblasts' centres of USSR. In due time, most of the affiliates separated from the Dipromisto system into separate institutes. Currently the Institute has three affiliates: Ivano-Frankivsk, Rivne, and Volyn affiliates.

History 

The Institute "DIPROMISTO" was established on September 12, 1930. According to the Government of Ukrainian SSR Statute, the Institute had been assigned the tasks of urban planning, design residential and community buildings, and scientific work in the field of urban planning. During the pre-war period, Dipromisto’s team had produced a great number of projects on regional planning in the most significant industrial regions, planning of cities and villages, design of community facilities, residential and public buildings, allocation of new industrial development, guidance and control on construction, scientific elaboration of key issues in spatial and urban planning, and experimental and standard design. During 1943-44, the key task of the Institute was to identify the loss to urban economies caused by war and define top-priority measures to assist the recovery of the cities of Ukrainian SSR. The huge destruction caused by war events in cities and villages demanded not only wide planning measures, but also new approaches to solving problems in the sphere of urban planning. In the 1950s, the attention of planners turned to verdurization and improvement of cities and villages, and the formation of their architectural view and landscape. In relation to such tendencies in 1962 a new architectural-planning workshop on resort-recreational objects design was created in the Institute in which both theoretical and practical works on resort design and typification have been made. In 1960-70s a landscape workshop was formed in the Institute in which the works on landscape reconstruction of green plantations and natural landscapes organisation have been designed.
Having started in late 1960s the work on schemes of regional planning for 25 Oblasts of Ukrainian SSR lasted until 1989. In 1985 DIPROMISTO started working on Summary Scheme of Regional Planning of Ukrainian SSR. In this complex scheme the versatile analyses of territorial resources and the state of environment, settlement systems, social, engineer and transport infrastructure has been given. With obtaining the state independence by Ukraine the tasks of revaluation of factors of regions and the whole state development, defining new priority axes of development, reorganisation of settlement system in consideration with political and economic changes, providing the integrated intrastate system of spatial and urban development, taking into account a market relations in planning of settlements development had arisen ahead of the experts in the field of spatial and urban planning.Since the beginning of 1990s, an active work on implementation of geographical information technologies into spatial and urban planning is carried out in the Institute. Already in 1991-1993, the experts of DIPROMISTO have elaborated geographical information system for the purposes of urban planning – MISTO. Since 1995 the Base Center on implementation of GIS into spatial and urban planning is functioning in the structure of the Institute. Already in the end of 1995, it became evident that further usage of own software wasn’t enough to solve the tasks arisen before the Center and the whole Institute. Consequently, an active implementation of software products by ESRI – the leader in GIS software production – had been started. Such technological re-equipment allowed not only to rise significantly the quality of spatial and urban planning works, but also to come to rethinking of methodology of both spatial and urban planning and of regions and settlements governing development.The strengthening of the Institute in conditions of independent Ukraine has been realized under the direction of Yurii Mykolaiovych Bilokon, Doctor of Architecture, Professor, People’s Architect of Ukraine. The activity of Yurii Mykolaiovych Bilokon in the Institute has been wide and versatile – as a talented architect, who was highly aware of the problems of both planning and architectural design, he made a lot for improvement and development of the Institute functioning. Yurii Bilokon became one of the initiators of spatial planning of cross-border regions and elaborated methodological basis for these works. Bilokon Y.M. paid a great attention to scientific activity development in the Institute, education of the next generation of experts having been created a scientific-production-educational complex "Arhmistobud" on the base of the Institute in collaboration with the Department of Urban Planning of Kyiv National University of Construction and Architecture, implementation of the latest information technologies into the productive activity.In 2009, in gratitude for 16 years of the talented leadership and in memory of the passionate role of Yurii Bilokon’s personality in the development of the Institute, the staff has initiated to name the Institute "DIPROMISTO" after Y.M.Bilokon which was adopted by the Order of the Ministry of Regional Development of Ukraine.

Activity 

The activity of DIPROMISTO is directed to scientific support of project works in the field of spatial and urban planning and architecture, creating a normative and methodological basis for planning and development of territories, as well as elaboration of spatial and urban planning documentation for settlements, regions and the country as a whole, project documentation on civil construction and landscape architecture, creation and implementation of geographical information decision support systems in the field of spatial and urban planning, including automated systems of urban cadastre, elaboration of land management works, basic and advanced training of experts in spatial and urban planning.The Institute is appointed to be a base organisation on scientific and technical activities in construction (Order of the Ministry of Regional Development, Construction and Housing of Ukraine from 3 May 2012 No.190). This entrust the Institute with functions of scientific, research, normative-methodological and information support to planning and developing of territories and settlements, as well as support to Standardisation Technical Committee "Planning of territories and settlements" (TK314) created on the base of the Institute "DIPROMISTO" according to the Order of Ministry of Regional Development, Construction and Housing of Ukraine from 21 February 2012 No.73.

Works 

During the last years DIPROMISTO’s team had elaborated such works as the General Scheme of Planning of the Territory of Ukraine (the main document in the field of spatial planning adopted by the Law of Ukraine in 2002)  and supports methodologically and monitors its implementation; schemes of planning of the territories of the Autonomous Republic of Crimea, oblasts, and raions of Ukraine; complex territorial schemes of nature protection; joint projects on spatial development of the cross-border regions; joint international projects on spatial development; general plans of cities; zoning plans; detailed plans of territories; projects of organisation of territories of nature protected areas; spatial planning substantiation of international transport corridor No.5 passage; projects on land cost assessment.
Moreover, according to elaborated in Dipromisto Institute projects the Taras Shevchenko National Academy Theatre of Opera and Ballet in Kyiv and Odessa National Academy Theatre of Opera and Ballet have been reconstructed; and such objects as National Complex "Expocentre of Ukraine" in Kyiv; buildings of State Tax Inspectorate of Pechersk Rayon in Kyiv City, Kyiv National Linguistic University, Ukrgazprom; Kyiv Academic Puppet Theatre; the complex of buildings and structures of the Embassy of Belarus Republic in Ukraine; the building of the Academy of State Tax Service of Ukraine, in Irpin); the range of residential buildings of advanced comfort, and ordinary residential buildings have been built.
The experts of the Institute took active part in elaboration of the project of Urban Planning Code; the range of state building norms and state standards in the field of spatial and urban planning; methodological documents on spatial and urban planning projects elaboration, implementation of GIS-technologies into spatial and urban planning, land cost assessment, technical design of theatres, cultural and performance buildings, acoustic computation of auditoriums, etc.

References

External links 
 Official web-page of Dipromisto Institute
 Official Facebook page of Dipromisto Institute
 Giprograd. Information / Committee on Housing, Construction and Urban Planning of UN Economic Commission for Europe. – Kyiv: Poligrafknyga, 1990. – 20 p.
 Approach and prospects of development of the cities of Ukraine: collected scientific works. Kyiv: SE USSRIUD "Dipromisto" named after Y.M.Bilokon – electronic versions of issues in the archive of Vernadsky National Library of Ukraine

Urban planning in Ukraine
Organizations based in Kyiv
Government-owned companies of Ukraine